The Palazzo Caotorta Angaran  is a palace located on the Canal Grande of Venice, between the Palazzo Balbi and, across the Rio della Frescada, the Palazzo Civran Grimani in the Sestiere of Dorsoduro, Venice, Italy.

History
The palace was initially erected in the 14th century, but underwent a near complete reconstruction in 1956 under Angelo Scattolin. The ground floor has a portal opening to the canal.

References

Caotorta-Angaran
Caotorta-Angaran
Renaissance architecture in Venice